WSOG is an FM broadcasting station on 88.1 MHz at Spring Valley, Illinois.  It broadcasts Catholic radio programs, primarily EWTN Radio supplemented with local programs.  It is licensed to Spirit Education Association, Inc. and has studios at St. Bede Academy in Peru, Illinois.


Stations
, WSOG uses 5 additional translators, and has applied for 2 more.  The Roman Catholic Diocese of Rockford has also applied for other stations.

In addition, commercial station 94.3 WPMJ Chillicothe, Illinois was in the process of being sold to CRCI, L.L.C., a company controlled by WSOG project coordinator Allen C. Drake of El Paso, Illinois.

References

External links

 

Bureau County, Illinois
Catholic radio stations
Radio stations established in 2002
Roman Catholic Diocese of Rockford
LaSalle County, Illinois
2002 establishments in Illinois
SOG